Mahabali is a benevolent Asura king from Hindu mythology.

Mahabali may also refer to:

Mythology 
 Mahabali, a Shaiva demon defeated by goddess Durga, after whom the Temple of Mahabaleswar in Maharashtra state is known
 Mahabali, an epithet for the Nanda Dynasty King
 Mahabali, son of Gomata Raja (brother of Bharata), that inherited Gomata Raja's kingdom
 Mahabali, a disciple of Guru Dirghatamas
 Mahabali Umang, a name for Hanuman in Manipur

Other uses 
 Mahabali (film), a 1983 Malayalam film
 Mahabali Singh (born 1950), Indian MP
 Mahabali Shera (born 1990), Indian wrestler